Khutia is a village in Gulripshi District of Abkhazia. In 2002 the population was 101 (96% Georgians). Before 2008 it was occupied by Russia.

References

Literature 
 Georgian Soviet Encyclopedia

Populated places in Gulripshi District